Targioni Tozzetti is a surname. Notable people with the surname include:

 Adolfo Targioni Tozzetti (1823–1902), Italian entomologist who specialised in Homoptera
 Giovanni Targioni Tozzetti (1712–1783), Italian naturalist
 Giovanni Targioni-Tozzetti (1863–1934), Italian librettist

Compound surnames